Thomas Sherwood may refer to:

Thomas Sherwood (martyr) (c. 1551–1578), English Catholic martyr
Thomas Adiel Sherwood (1791–1879), American academic
Thomas Kilgore Sherwood (1903–1976), American chemical engineer
Thomas R. Sherwood (1827–1896), Chief Justice of the Michigan Supreme Court
Thomas E. Sherwood (1835–1897), mayor of Dallas, Texas
Thomas Adiel Sherwood (judge) (1834–1918), justice of the Missouri Supreme Court
Thomas Sherwood (assemblyman), New York assemblyman 1843, see 66th New York State Legislature